Once Love Was Lost is the first full length studio album by Russian hardcore/metal band Vorvaň. The album was released on October 14, 2016 through German labels Wooaaargh and Darkened Days Records.

Background 
After the release of two EPs and a split Vorvaň started to work on the material for a full-length album. It took more than a year to finish recording, the band wanted to make “Once Love Was Lost” sound differently and stand up to the works of the bands that had influenced Vorvaň.

Recording 
The album was recorded at Pentagram House, studio run by the band members. Famous sound producer Kurt Ballou mixed the record at Godcity Studio, Brad Boatright mastered it. Double LP edition includes a bonus cover on the song Struck a Nerve originally performed by Machine Head and includes a 32-page booklet with illustrations and lyrics.

Track listing
All music composed and produced by Vorvaň, all lyrics written by Eli Mavrychev

Personnel 
Album personnel and recording history as listed in LP liner notes.

Vorvaň 
 Eli Mavrychev – lead vocals, backing vocals, guitars
 Eugene Cherevkov – guitars
 Igor Butz – bass
 Zakk Hemma – drums, backing vocals

Guest musicians 
 Meghan O'Neil Pennie (Punch, Super Unison) – vocals on "Sirens"
 Armin Schweiger (Afgrund, Distaste) – vocals on "The Black Kaleidoscope"

Art and design 
 Hal Rotter – artwork
 Eli Mavrychev – concept, design, layout
 Eva Ivanova – photography

Production and recording 
 Vorvaň – production
 Igor Butz – engineering at Pentagram House Studio
 Kurt Ballou – mixing at Godcity Studios
 Brad Boatright – mastering at Audiosiege
 Jack Shirley – additional recording at The Atomic Garden Recording Studio
 Lukas Haidinger – additional recording at Ddf Studios
 Timur Mukhametzyanov – additional engineering

References

2016 debut albums
Vorvaň albums
Albums produced by Kurt Ballou